The Riverfront Trail is a multiuse trail in Greater Moncton, along the shores of the Petitcodiac River. The trail comprises the Moncton section of the Trans Canada Trail, passing through the city's Riverfront Park, and extends to the neighbouring communities of Riverview  and Dieppe. Points of interest include Bore View Park, Settlers Green, a skateboard park, the Hal Betts Commemorative Sportsplex and the Treitz Haus. 

Five kilometres in length on the Moncton side, the Riverfront Trail offer both paved paths and a softer dirt surface for walkers, runners, and bikers. Portions of the trail are cleared for winter running.

The trail, along with several Moncton streets, is used annually for Legs For Literacy, a Boston Marathon qualifying race also featuring a half marathon, 10km, and 5km.

See also
 List of events in Greater Moncton

References

Hiking trails in New Brunswick
Trans Canada Trail
Parks in Moncton
Sport in Moncton
Parks in Dieppe, New Brunswick
Riverview, New Brunswick
Transport in Albert County, New Brunswick
Transport in Westmorland County, New Brunswick